Tomašica  is a village in Croatia with a population of 365 according to the 2011 census.

References 

Populated places in Bjelovar-Bilogora County